The Sentosa Monorail was a monorail system which served as the main means of transportation on the island of Sentosa in Singapore, and has been replaced by the new monorail system, the Sentosa Express. The system was constructed at a cost of S$14 million by Von Roll of Switzerland, who also built the Singapore Cable Car.

Commencing operations on 23 February 1982, the line initially opened with  only five stations. In 1987, the Ferry Terminal Monorail Station began operations when the Sentosa Ferry Terminal opened that year. In 1991, the Underwater World Monorail Station commenced operations when Underwater World opened that year. It operated several 16-car, non-air conditioned trains in a unidirectional counter-clockwise single loop through seven stations located around the western half of the island. The monorail rides were initially charged at S$3 for adults and S$1.50 for children. The trip was later made free for passengers, who could ride the system as often as they wished throughout their stay on the island. Four of the stations have two platforms; for such stations, the Spanish solution was implemented, where passengers alight at one platform and board at the opposite platform.

History

Background
Plans for the monorail were first announced in 1979, and it was planned to serve as a mode of transportation around Sentosa as well as to make the island more attractive to visitors. At that point in time, transport around the island was provided by a fleet of double-decker buses.

Construction and opening
Site surveys commenced in March 1980, and construction began six months later. Initially expected to be completed in April 1982, it was completed two months before schedule at a cost of S$16 million, and opened on 23 February 1982. Four intermediate stations along the line at several locations around the island were opened on 1 December the same year. This resulted in the bus service to these locations being terminated, and the monorail thus became the main mode of transport around the island.

As a result of the monorail's opening, as well as the opening of several other attractions, the number of visitors to Sentosa also shot up, increasing to 1,067,192 visitors from 567,567 visitors over the same period in the previous year.

Closure
Due to the rapid modernisation of the island, maintenance problems, increasing costs, and declining popularity as visitors started complaining that the ride was slow and uncomfortable, the Sentosa Monorail ceased operations on 16 March 2005 to make way for the new four-station Sentosa Express monorail. Much of the track and all of the rolling stock were sold as scrap for S$350,000. A subsequent assessment showed that some of the butt welds did not match the specification of British Standards. Five of the monorail stations have been repurposed for other uses, such as the "Surrender Chamber" at Fort Siloso, a restaurant being developed at the Central Beach, and the SDC Office was rebuilt and converted into a bar. Gateway was demolished when the line closed and Ferry Terminal was demolished in March 2007 to make way for Resorts World Sentosa.

Stations

There were no terminal stations for Sentosa Monorail.
 Station 1: Ferry Terminal – Opened in 1987; closed in 2005; demolished in March 2007
 Station 2: Underwater World – Opened in 1991; closed in 2005; subsequently repurposed; demolished in 2017 together with Underwater World
 Station 3: Fort Siloso (first station to be closed down) – Opened in 1982; closed in 2005; subsequently repurposed
 Station 4: Cable Car – Opened in 1982; closed in 2005; subsequently repurposed
 Station 5: Central Beach / Palawan Beach – Opened in 1982; closed in 2005; subsequently repurposed
 Station 6: SDC Office / Ficus – Opened in 1982; closed in 2005; subsequently repurposed
 Station 7: Gateway / Causeway / Visitor Arrival Centre – Opened in 1982; closed and demolished in 2005

References

External links 

 Map of the track

Demolished buildings and structures in Singapore
Defunct monorails
Monorails in Singapore
Railway lines in Singapore
Southern Islands
Sentosa
Von Roll Holding people movers
Railway lines opened in 1982
Railway lines closed in 2005
1982 establishments in Singapore
2005 disestablishments in Singapore